Jessie Cortés Ramos is a Puerto Rican politician and former mayor of Aguada. Cortés is affiliated with the Popular Democratic Party (PPD) and served as mayor from 2013 to 2017. He is Currently  the representative of Puerto Rico's 18th representative district by the Popular Democratic Party. He is one of the vocal voices of the PDP in the West side of the island.

References

External links

|-

 

Living people
Mayors of places in Puerto Rico
Popular Democratic Party (Puerto Rico) politicians
People from Aguada, Puerto Rico
1970 births